South Dakota Highway 34 (SD 34) is a state route that runs parallel to Interstate 90 across the entire state of South Dakota. It begins at the Wyoming border west of Belle Fourche, as a continuation of Wyoming Highway 24 (WYO 24).

History

When first implemented in 1926, the western terminus was at South Dakota Highway 45 near Gann Valley.  In the 1940s and early 1950s, a road was gradually built from Pierre to SD 45 via Fort Thompson, and SD 34 was extended west along it upon its completion.  A further extension westward occurred in February 1961, when SD 34 absorbed the alignment of South Dakota Highway 24.

In the late 1960s, a portion of SD 34 (along with U.S. Highway 14) was upgraded as part of the construction of Interstate 90.  The segment between Whitewood and Sturgis (exits 23 and 30) remains signed with I-90 and U.S. 14.

A  segment of SD 34 in Sanborn County has been upgraded to 4 lanes.  This is part of a 4-lane route from Huron to Mitchell via South Dakota Highway 37.

Major intersections

See also

 List of state highways in South Dakota

References

External links

 South Dakota Highways Page: Highways 31-60

034
Transportation in Butte County, South Dakota
Transportation in Lawrence County, South Dakota
Transportation in Meade County, South Dakota
Transportation in Ziebach County, South Dakota
Transportation in Haakon County, South Dakota
Transportation in Stanley County, South Dakota
Transportation in Hughes County, South Dakota
Transportation in Hyde County, South Dakota
Transportation in Buffalo County, South Dakota
Transportation in Jerauld County, South Dakota
Transportation in Sanborn County, South Dakota
Transportation in Miner County, South Dakota
Transportation in Lake County, South Dakota
Transportation in Moody County, South Dakota